Yu Min-hwa (born 25 March 1988) is a South Korean female tennis player.

Yu has career-high WTA rankings of 513 in singles, achieved on 26 July 2010, and 338 in doubles, reached on 21 June 2010. Yu has won one singles title and eight doubles titles on tournaments of the ITF Circuit.

Yu has represented South Korea at the Fed Cup, where she has a win–loss record of 2–6.

ITF Circuit finals

Singles: 1 (1 title)

Doubles: 16 (9 titles, 7 runner-ups)

External links
 
 
 

1988 births
Living people
South Korean female tennis players
Tennis players at the 2010 Asian Games
Asian Games competitors for South Korea
21st-century South Korean women